Cathy Camper is an artist, librarian and author of books for children and teens, living in Portland, Oregon.  She wrote  Bugs Before Time, illustrated by Steve Kirk, and the graphic novels Lowriders in Space and the forthcoming Lowriders to the Center of the Earth, illustrated by "Raúl the Third" (Raul Gonzalez). She has also exhibited seed art, entering work in the Minnesota State Fair's Crop Art show starting in 1989. Her portrait of James Brown was featured in Simple Times: Crafts for Poor People by Amy Sedaris.

Camper was born in Wisconsin, lived for several years in Minnesota, and moved to Portland, Oregon in 2005. She identifies herself as an Arab-American.

References

External links
 Official website

Living people
American children's writers
Writers from Portland, Oregon
Artists from Portland, Oregon
American women children's writers
American women artists
Year of birth missing (living people)
21st-century American women